Evgeniy Solozhenkin (born July 31, 1966 in Saint Petersburg) is a Russian chess Grandmaster.

Tournament results
 1986 : wins, at age 20, the 59th Leningrad championship
 1993 : wins the colossal Cappelle-la-Grande Open in France (416 players), above 19 GMs and 61 IMs
 1998 : wins for the second time the championship of his hometown (now called Saint Petersburg); wins the "Heart of Finland" tournament in Jyväskylä
 1999 : wins the 41st Reggio Emilia chess tournament; 5th at the Paris championship (won by Ashot Anastasian, 225 players)
 2000 : 3rd at the Padova open, after Gennadi Timoshenko and Erald Dervishi.

For ChessBase he published the CD "Opposite-Coloured Bishop Endgames".

His daughter Elizaveta Solozhenkina (born 2003) also is chess master.

Controversies
Solozhenkin accused Bibisara Assaubayeva on several internet articles of cheating during the World Youth U14 Championship in Uruguay in September 2017. The FIDE Ethics Commission suspended Solozhenkin for making unsubstantiated allegations of cheating. A group of grandmasters wrote an open letter in support of Solozhenkin. Assaubayeva's family sued Solozhenkin for defamatory allegations made in public and in the media that offended Assaubayeva's honor and dignity. The Moscow Appellate Court ordered Solozhenkin to apologize, disavow his allegations to the media, delete the defamatory articles, and pay a compensatory sum of 100 thousand rubles.

References

External links
 

1966 births
Living people
Russian chess players
Soviet chess players
Chess grandmasters
Sportspeople from Saint Petersburg